America's Foundation for Chess (AF4C) is a nonprofit chess foundation based in Bellevue, Washington, United States, a suburb of Seattle. It was founded in June 2000 by Scott Oki and Laurie Oki as the Seattle Chess Foundation. Entrepreneur Erik Anderson and grandmaster Yasser Seirawan are also credited as founders of America's Foundation for Chess.

The foundation was originally based at Carillon Point, in suburban Kirkland, Washington, and moved to Bellevue in 2013.

AF4C sponsored the U.S. Chess Championship starting in 1999.

First Move
The foundation's First Move curriculum uses chess as a learning tool in second and third grade classrooms to teach critical and creative thinking skills and improve overall academic achievement. First Move is taught one hour per week, over the course of the school year. The Chess Lady teaches the curriculum via streaming video, classroom teachers facilitate the activities and can learn with their students. In 2014-15 the program will serve about 140,000 students across the United States and a few schools internationally.

See also
Chess as mental training

Notes and references

Notes

References

External links

Foundations based in the United States
2000 establishments in Washington (state)
Companies based in Bellevue, Washington
Chess organizations